Yahia Boushaki is an Algiers residential, administrative and commercial neighbourhood located in the commune of Bab Ezzouar in Kabylie within Algeria.

Description 
The neighbourhood "Yahia Boushaki", also known to be a Chinatown, is a residential, administrative and commercial zone of the city of Algiers.

History 
The neighbourhood was created by decree of November 8, 1978, as part of the development of the city of Algiers.

Transport

Train 
 Bab Ezzouar Railway Station
 Dar El Beïda Railway Station
 Oued Smar Railway Station

Tramway

Gallery

References 

Yahia Boushaki Neighbourhood
Neighbourhood of Algiers
Neighbourhoods in Algeria
Algiers
Algiers Province
Populated places in Algiers Province
Kabylie
People from Thénia
People from Thénia District
People from Boumerdès Province
Kabyle people
Boushaki family
Geography of Algiers
Shopping districts and streets